Marta Cubí Tudó is a retired Spanish football player.

Cubí started playing football in her hometown team, CF Igualada, which was promoted to the women's second division in 2002. The next year she was signed by RCD Espanyol. Her second season at Espanyol was the best of her career as she was the top scorer in the 2004–05 League with 32 goals. The following year Espanyol won the League and Cup. Cubí was Espanyol's top scorer at the 2006-07 UEFA Women's Cup together with Adriana Martín, with 6 goals.

She was dismissed from the team in May 2009 together with Noemí Rubio. Both players subsequently moved to Espanyol's rival, FC Barcelona. One year later she signed for newly promoted CE Sant Gabriel, also from Barcelona. She also works as a trainer for Catalonia's Under-16 team and organizes a summer camp for girls in Camprodon under her name.

Cubí was briefly a member of the Spanish national team between 2004 and 2005. In May 2008 she was called up for a Euro qualifier against Northern Ireland's women's national football team, but she did not play.

References

1985 births
Living people
People from Igualada
Sportspeople from the Province of Barcelona
Spanish women's footballers
Spain women's international footballers
Primera División (women) players
FC Barcelona Femení players
RCD Espanyol Femenino players
Women's association football forwards
Sportswomen from Catalonia
Footballers from Catalonia
CE Sant Gabriel players
FC Levante Las Planas players